This is a list of WBC Muaythai female diamond champions, showing female diamond champions certificated by the World Boxing Council Muaythai (WBC Muaythai). The WBC, which is one of the four major governing bodies in professional boxing, started certifying their own Muay Thai world champions in 19 different weight classes in 2005.

Super bantamweight

See also
List of WBC Muaythai world champions
List of WBC Muaythai female world champions
List of WBC Muaythai international champions
List of WBC Muaythai female international champions
List of WBC Muaythai international challenge winners
List of WBC Muaythai female international challenge winners
List of WBC Muaythai European champions
List of IBF Muaythai world champions

References

Lists of Muay Thai champions
WBC
Lists of women by occupation